Mayhew Lake is a lake in Cook County, Minnesota, in the United States.

Mayhew Lake was named for Henry Mayhew, a state surveyor's assistant.

References

Lakes of Minnesota
Lakes of Cook County, Minnesota